Swiss wine is produced from nearly  of vineyards, and the wines are mainly produced in the west and in the south of Switzerland, in the cantons of Geneva, Neuchâtel, Ticino, Valais and Vaud. White grape varieties are grown on 43% of the country's vineyard area, and red grape varieties on 57%.

Nearly all the national production is drunk within the national boundaries; less than 2% of the wine is exported (mainly to Germany). For example, in 2019, only 13,193 hectolitres were exported. Switzerland ranks in the top 10 of per capita consumption of wine, and as of 1983 imported two thirds of it, including more Beaujolais than the United States. In 2019, 1,784,371 hectolitres of wine consumed was imported, compared to 945,585 hectolitres of domestic wine consumed.

History
The tradition of wine and viticulture in Switzerland is very old, beginning no later than the Roman era. Coming from the Mediterranean basin, viticulture was generally introduced from the 1st century AD, after integration into the Roman Empire. Ticino and Upper Valais are perhaps exceptions: it is possible that the cultivated vine (Vitis vinifera) was introduced from the Iron Age south of the Alps and that it then crossed the Alpine passes.

The oldest recorded bottle, made in ceramic, was found near Sembrancher (Valais), in a Celtic tomb of a lady of 2nd century BC. An inscription on the bottle indicates that it contained wine. Around the 150s BC, in the Celtic era, the people in Valais offered wine to the dead, and probably they also drank the same wine. After a century, the Roman amphorae also appeared.

Vineyards became an integral part of the Swiss landscape. The most extensive terraced vineyards are found in Valais and Lavaux.

Geography and climate

Six wine regions are defined by Swiss Wine Promotion, an association that represents Swiss winemakers. They are: Geneva, German-speaking Switzerland, Three Lakes (including Neuchatel, Fribourg, and part of the canton of Bern), Ticino, Vaud, and Valais.

Switzerland is a fairly small country with great diversity in climate and soils due to the Alps. Ticino, on the southern side, has a sunnier climate more influenced by the Mediterranean, while the rest of the country, being on the north side, are more affected by weather coming off the Atlantic Ocean. Contrary to northern Switzerland, there is also a tradition of olive oil-making in Ticino, possibly also since the Roman Era.

Grape varieties

The two most common grape varieties in Switzerland are the red Pinot noir at around 30% and the white Chasselas at around 27%. A large number of grape varieties are cultivated in Switzerland, many of them indigenous or regional specialties.

{| class="wikitable sortable"
|+ Common grape varieties in Switzerland (2009, all varieties greater than 50 ha)
! Variety || Color || Synonym(s) || Area (%) || Area (ha)
|- bgcolor="FFA0C0"
| Pinot noir || red || Blauburgunder || align="right" | 29.7 || align="right" | 4402
|- bgcolor="FFFFE0"
| Chasselas || white || Gutedel || align="right" | 27.1 || align="right" | 4013
|- bgcolor="FFA0C0"
| Gamay || red || || align="right" | 10.2 || align="right" | 1514
|- bgcolor="FFA0C0"
| Merlot || red || || align="right" | 6.9 || align="right" | 1028
|- bgcolor="FFFFE0"
| Müller-Thurgau || white || || align="right" | 3.3 || align="right" | 493
|- bgcolor="FFA0C0"
| Gamaret || red || ||align="right" | 2.6 || align="right" | 380
|- bgcolor="FFFFE0"
| Chardonnay || white || || align="right" | 2.2 || align="right" | 321
|- bgcolor="FFFFE0"
| Sylvaner || white || Rhin ||align="right" | 1.6 || align="right" | 241
|- bgcolor="FFFFE0"
| Pinot gris || white || Malvoisie ||align="right" | 1.5 || align="right" | 216
|- bgcolor="FFA0C0"
| Garanoir || red || || align="right" | 1.4 || align="right" | 203
|- bgcolor="FFA0C0"
| Syrah || red || || align="right" | 1.2 || align="right" | 181
|- bgcolor="FFFFE0"
| Petite Arvine || white || || align="right" | 1.0 || align="right" | 154
|- bgcolor="FFFFE0"
| Sauvignon blanc || white || ||align="right" | 0.9 || align="right" | 134
|- bgcolor="FFA0C0"
| Humagne rouge || red || || align="right" | 0.9 || align="right" | 128
|- bgcolor="FFA0C0"
| Cornalin || red || Landroter || align="right" | 0.8 || align="right" | 116
|- bgcolor="FFA0C0"
| Diolinoir || red || || align="right" | 0.8 || align="right" | 112
|- bgcolor="FFFFE0"
| Pinot blanc || white || || align="right" | 0.7 || align="right" | 105
|- bgcolor="FFFFE0"
| Savagnin blanc || white || Heida || align="right" | 0.6 || align="right" | 83
|- bgcolor="FFA0C0"
| Cabernet Sauvignon || red || || align="right" | 0.4 || align="right" | 63
|- bgcolor="FFA0C0"
| Cabernet Franc || red || || align="right" | 0.4 || align="right" | 54
|- bgcolor="FFFFE0"
| All white varieties || || || align="right" | 42.1 || align="right" | 6245
|- bgcolor="FFA0C0"
| All red varieties || || || align="right" | 57.9 || align="right" | 8574
|- bgcolor="lightgrey"
| Grand total || || || align="right" | 100.0 || align="right" | 14820
|}

Other grapes grown in Switzerland include hybrid varieties like Muscat bleu which had  in cultivation for commercial winemaking 2009.

Classification
For a long time, Switzerland lacked detailed national regulations regarding wine classification, which meant that it was to a large extent up to wine producers about what to put on wine labels; neither a German wine-style Prädikat system or a French wine-style appellation system was implemented, and as a non-EU member, Switzerland did not have to implement European Union wine regulations. Wines were usually labelled by their village of origin, by grape variety, or using a brand name. From the late 1980s, though, a French-style Appellation d'Origine Contrôlée system started to be implemented, starting with the Canton of Geneva. These regulations are mainly implemented by the cantons themselves.

Wine styles
Over the years, the Swiss have developed a number of unique specialty wines from grapes rarely found outside Switzerland. These include:

Vin des glaciers—a sherry-style wine that utilizes a solera system of wine stored in larch wood or oak barrels that are never fully emptied with newer vintages being added to the barrels containing the older vintages. The wines are primarily made from the Swiss wine grape Rèze in Valais canton.

See also
:Category:Wine regions of Switzerland
Oeil de Perdrix, Swiss wine style
Olive production in Switzerland
Agriculture in Switzerland
Old World wine

References

External links
 Documentary about Heroic Viticulture in Valais
swisswine.ch, the trade organisation promoting Swiss Wines